Dichrostachys kirkii is a species of flowering plant in the family Fabaceae. It is found in Ethiopia and Somalia.

References

kirkii
Flora of Ethiopia
Flora of Somalia
Near threatened flora of Africa
Taxonomy articles created by Polbot